Joseph Marie Louis Duval (11 October 1928 – 23 May 2009) was the French Roman Catholic Archbishop of the Roman Catholic Archdiocese of Rouen.

Born in Chênex, Duval was ordained to the priesthood on 8 June 1953. On 14 May 1974 Pope Paul VI appointed Duval auxiliary bishop of the Roman Catholic Archdiocese of Rennes, and he was consecrated on 6 July 1974. On 5 June 1978 Pope Paul VI appointed Duval Coadjutor Archbishop of Rouen and, on 6 May 1981, he became the archbishop. He retired on 16 October 2003.

Archbishop Duval was concerned about the activities of Bishop Jacques Gaillot while archbishop.

Notes

1928 births
2009 deaths
People from Haute-Savoie
Archbishops of Rouen
20th-century Roman Catholic archbishops in France
21st-century Roman Catholic archbishops in France